Louis Alexandre de Bourbon (6 June 1678 – 1 December 1737), a legitimated prince of the blood royal, was the son of Louis XIV and of his mistress Françoise-Athénaïs, marquise de Montespan. At the age of five, he became grand admiral of France.

Biography
Born at the Château de Clagny in Versailles, Louis Alexandre de Bourbon was the third son and youngest child of Louis XIV born out-of-wedlock with Madame de Montespan. At birth, he was put in the care of Madame de Montchevreuil along with his older sister Françoise-Marie de Bourbon.

Louis Alexandre was created Count of Toulouse in 1681 at the time of his legitimation, and, in 1683, at the age of five, grand admiral. In February 1684, he became colonel of an infantry regiment named after him and in 1693 mestre de camp of a cavalry regiment. During the War of Spanish Succession, he was given the task of defending Sicily. In January 1689, he was named governor of Guyenne, a title which he exchanged for that of governor of Brittany six years later. On 3 January 1696, he was created a marshal of France, becoming commander of the royal armies the following year. During the War of the Spanish Succession he commanded the French fleet at the Battle of Vélez-Málaga in 1704.

Though his father had legitimated him and his three surviving siblings, and even declared his two sons by Madame de Montespan fit to eventually succeed him to the throne of France, this was not to be, as immediately after Louis XIV's death the Parlement of Paris reversed the king's will.

Unlike his brother, Louis Auguste, Duke of Maine, who was barred from the regency council, Toulouse was not kept from a political role, and soon after, he was named (minister of the Navy), inheriting a seasoned staff headed by Joseph Pellerin. He remained in this capacity until being succeeded by Joseph Fleuriau d'Armenonville in 1722, the same Fleuriau d'Armenonville who had sold him the castle of Rambouillet in 1706.

The proposal of his marriage to Charlotte de Lorraine, Mademoiselle d'Armagnac, member of a cadet branch of the House of Guise had met with the categorical refusal of Louis XIV.

Marriage
On 2 February 1723, the comte de Toulouse married Marie Victoire de Noailles, a daughter of the Anne Jules, duc de Noailles, in a private ceremony in Paris. She was the widow of Louis de Pardaillan de Gondrin (1688-1712), his nephew, son of his half-brother Louis Antoine de Pardaillan de Gondrin, whose mother was Madame de Montespan.  The marriage was kept secret until the death of the regent.

Court
He and his sisters tried to avoid the court and the intrigues of their brother, the duc du Maine, and his wife Anne Louise Bénédicte de Bourbon, the duchess, at the Château de Sceaux.

Shortly before his death in 1715, Louis XIV added a codicil to his will stating that if all legitimate members of the House of Bourbon, both those descended from Louis and more distant kinsmen, died out, the throne of France could be inherited by the duc du Maine and the comte de Toulouse.  The decision was reversed after the death of Louis XIV when Louis Alexandre's cousin, Philippe II, Duke of Orléans, as the new regent, had the Parlement de Paris void that portion of the will.

The comte de Toulouse died at the Château de Rambouillet on 1 December 1737.  He was buried in the village 12th century Saint-Lubin church.  On 30 September 1766, the countess died at the Hôtel de Toulouse, the Parisian mansion not far from the Louvre which the count had bought from Phélypeaux, marquis de La Vrillière, in 1712.  She too was buried in the family crypt in the Rambouillet church.

Upon the count's death, the duc de Penthièvre succeeded his father in his posts and titles.  Because of the marriage of Mademoiselle de Penthièvre to Louis Philippe II, Duke of Orléans, the comte de Toulouse is an ancestor of the modern House of Orléans, which also descends from Toulouse's two surviving full sisters.

Ancestry

Notes

References

Bernot, Jacques (2012), Le comte de Toulouse 1678-1737: Amiral de France Gouverneur de Bretagne. Lanore. (ISBN 978-2851576668).
Lenotre, G., Le Château de Rambouillet : six siècles d'histoire, Calmann-Lévy, collection « Châteaux : décors de l'histoire », Paris, 1930, 256 p. Réédition : Denoël, Paris, 1984, 215 p..
https://web.archive.org/web/20110720224934/http://radiointensite.free.fr/articles.php?lng=fr&pg=863 - Scroll down to 41st paragraph to sentence beginning « Le mardi 25 novembre 1783, S.A.S. Mgr Louis Jean Marie de Bourbon, duc de Penthièvre, prince d’Anet et comte de Dreux, a fait transporter de l’église de Rambouillet dans la collégiale de Saint-Etienne de cette ville le cercueil de S.A.S. Mgr le comte de Toulouse, son père...»

 

 

1678 births
1737 deaths
17th-century peers of France
18th-century peers of France
Peers created by Louis XIV
17th-century French military personnel
18th-century French military personnel
People from Versailles
House of Bourbon-Penthièvre
Dukes of Vendôme
Dukes of Penthièvre
Dukes of Rambouillet
Counts of Toulouse
Admirals of France
Knights of the Golden Fleece of Spain
French naval commanders in the War of the Spanish Succession
Secretaries of State of the Navy (France)
House of Rochechouart
Burials at the Chapelle royale de Dreux
Ancien Régime office-holders
People of the Regency of Philippe d'Orléans
Grand Huntsmen of France
Illegitimate children of Louis XIV
Sons of kings
Dukes of Châteauvillain